Prasat Ta Muen Thom or Prasat Ta Moan Thom is a Khmer temple located on Cambodian-Thai border.

Its Khmer name translates literally to "Great Temple of Grandfather Chicken". It lies not far from two related temples in a densely forested area where access is difficult on one of the passes through the Dangrek Mountains. Prasat Ta Muen Toch ("Minor Temple of Grandfather Chicken"), the hospital chapel, lies two and half kilometers to the northwest and just 300 meters beyond that is the rest house chapel, Prasat Ta Muen ("Temple of Grandfather Chicken").  During the 1980s-90s, when the Khmer Rouge controlled the area, the temples in the region were looted by the Khmer Rouge to finance their guerrilla campaign. Many architectural pieces and original sculptures were stolen, sometimes detached using dynamite, and smuggled out of Cambodia or sold on the black market. These three temples, all within a few hundred meters of each other, formed a complex which was an important stop on a major route of the Khmer Empire, the Ancient Khmer Highway from its capital at Angkor to its major administrative center in the northwest, Phimai (now in Thailand).

Layout
The temple is located in the Ta Muen Thom pass at the top of the escarpment of the Dangrek Mountains which forms the current border between Cambodia and Thailand in the region. North of the border is the Khorat Plateau while to the south are steep cliffs as the mountains form sheer drops down to the plains Northwest Cambodia. Ta Muen Thom is constructed of laterite and laid out in a rectangular plan with the entrance facing south, highly unusual for Khmer temples which usually face east. It is suspected that this is due to the topography, both to meet travelers having just climbed the pass from the plains below and to provide a defensible position with a strategic view southward down the mountains. The temple's enclosure is 46 meters by 38 meters with its center in a central sanctuary constructed of pinkish-grey sandstone and preceded by a mandapa and an antarala. A natural channel in the bedrock was used as the somasutra, a funnel which transported holy water used in rituals from the statue in the main chamber, which flows out from the garbhagriha and indicates the relative importance of the site.

On the north side are two towers and two other laterite buildings that are still standing as well as the foundations of three other buildings which are no longer standing. These buildings are the remains of the highway rest house and hospital Jayavarman VII erected to add to the temple complex where pilgrims and travelers would spend the night and recuperate for the next leg of their journey. On the south facade, the same side as the main entrance, is the main gopura, which is much larger than the others. A large broad steep laterite staircase, also facing south and extending well down into Cambodian territory, leads to the entrance of the temple. There is also a laterite staircase that leads down to a stream on the Cambodian side which curves around the temple. The orientation of Ta Muen Thom is very similar to that of Prasat Hin Phimai and others at Phimai Historical Park.

Recent excavations inside the main tower have revealed the existence of a natural linga protruding from the top of the hill around which the temple was built. There is a similar natural linga at the Khmer temple Vat Phou in Laos.

Access
Because of its location on the Thai side of the current border, the temple is only accessible from Thailand. Access from Cambodia would be difficult because the ancient Khmer Highway that led to the pass has long since been retaken by the jungle. During the Cambodian–Thai border dispute (2009-2011) which was primarily centered around ownership of Preah Vihear Temple, border clashes spread to Ta Muen and access to the temple was temporarily closed. Afterwards, tensions remain high and tourists at the temple are not allowed to venture more than a few meters southward from the main entrance and armed Thai border police stand guard to mark the border.

Since 2010, the entrance of Ta Muen Thom temple on Cambodia side has become easier due to the road infrastructure has been developed, including a road leads to Ta Muen Thom temple which was built in 2009 and officially launched in 2010. It consists of 24 km red gravel roads (but it has been upgraded to the asphalt road in recent years) and 500-meter mountainous concrete road. Visitors are recommended to park their cars near the hill then they can continue walking through a half-kilometer mountainous concrete road that some parts of it are steep. At this point, tourists also enjoy with the spectacular landscape of Dangrek mountain range along with many big trees and forest flowers.

Gallery

See also 
 Prasat Ta Krabey

Notes

References
Michael Freeman, A guide to Khmer temples in Thailand & Laos, Rivers Books, 1996 974-8900-76-2
Michael Freeman, Palaces of the Gods: Khmer Art & Architecture in Thailand, River Books, 2001 974-8303-19-5
Yoshiaki Ishizawa, Along The Royal Roads To Angkor, Weatherhill, 1999 083-4804-72-7
Claude Jacques and Philippe Lafond, The Khmer Empire, River Books, 2007 974-9863-30-5
Vittorio Roveda, Images of the gods: khmer mythology in Cambodia, Thailand and Laos, River Books, 2005 974-9863-03-8
Betty Gosling, Origins of thai art, River Books, 2004 0-8348-0541-3

Archaeological sites in Thailand
Isan
Angkorian sites in Thailand
Tourist attractions in Surin province
Buildings and structures in Surin province